Short Heath Park is a public park in the Short Heath area of Erdington, Birmingham, UK. Short Heath Park is located a short walk away from Boldmere High street and Sutton Coldfield High street. Short Heath Park is approximately 14.5 Acres in size and Is operated by the Birmingham City council.

Redevelopment 

In 2009, Birmingham City Council's Parks and Nature Conservation department submitted a planning application for the park.  The application, which was for the "erection of 1.6m high boundary railings with 3.3m high entrance archways" was approved subject to conditions on 1 December 2009. Development began in January 2010.

References 

Parks and open spaces in Birmingham, West Midlands
Erdington